Christmas Is the Man from Galilee is a studio album by American Christian and country singer Cristy Lane. It was released in November 1983 via Liberty and LS Records and contained 21 tracks. It was Lane's first album release to comprise entirely of Christmas music. Due to her recent success with Christian audiences, the album contained mostly holiday inspirational favorites.

Background, content and release
During the late 1970s and early 1980s, Cristy Lane had country music commercial success with songs like "Let Me Down Easy" and "I Just Can't Stay Married to You". Her music was then marketed towards Christian audiences following the success of her country-crossover hit "One Day at a Time". Christmas Is the Man from Galilee was part of a series of albums that followed the song that was marketed towards this fan base. Future holiday compilations will derive from this original product. 

The album was produced by Lane's husband and manager, Lee Stoller. It contained a total of 21 tracks, which was mostly Christmas inspirational material. Examples included "God Rest Ye Merry Gentlemen", "What Child Is This?" and "Joy to the World". A handful of previously-recorded tracks were also featured including her 1977 hit "Shake Me I Rattle". Christmas Is the Man from Galilee was released in November 1983 on Liberty Records and LS Records. It was the eleventh studio album issued in Lane's music career. It was originally offered as a vinyl LP and a cassette. Both versions were sold on cable television networks as a way to market Lane's music to a broader audience.

Track listing

Personnel
All credits are adapted from the liner notes of Christmas Is the Man from Galilee.

Musical personnel
 David Briggs – Piano
 Clay Caire – Drums
 Ken Christensen – Piano
 Sonny Garrish – Guitar
 Jon Goin – Guitar
 Sheri Hoffman – Background vocals
 Mike Holland – Guitar
 Cristy Lane – Lead vocals
 Anne Marie – Background vocals
 Farrell Morris – Percussion
 Nashville String Machine – Strings
 Fred Newell – Guitar
 Steve Schaeffer – Bass
 Gene Siak – Piano
 Lisa Silver – Background vocals
 Diane Tidwell – Background vocals
 Kim Weldon – Bass

Technical personnel
 Ken Christensen – String arrangement
 Tom Harding – Engineer
 Disc Mastering – Mastering
 Dave Shipley – Engineer
 Lee Stoller – Producer
 Treasure Isle – Studio

Release history

References

1983 Christmas albums
Christmas albums by American artists
Cristy Lane albums
Liberty Records albums
LS Records albums